The Bankers (Ireland) Act 1928 is an Act of the Parliament of the United Kingdom which amended the Bankers (Ireland) Act 1845 in application to Northern Ireland after the 1921 Partition of Ireland, and to restrict circulation, in Northern Ireland, of notes issued outside of the United Kingdom. 

United Kingdom Acts of Parliament 1928
Financial regulation in the United Kingdom
Currency law in the United Kingdom